Positraction is the fourth studio album released by New York City noise rock band Live Skull, released on March 6, 1989 by Caroline Records.

Track listing

Track 11: from Sounds and Shigaku Limited Present: Beautiful Happiness compilation
Tracks 12-17 from Snuffer EP

Personnel
Adapted from the Positraction liner notes.

Live Skull
 Sonda Andersson – bass guitar 
 Mark C. – guitar
 Richard Hutchins – drums
 Tom Paine – guitar 
 Thalia Zedek – vocals

Production and additional personnel
 Martin Bisi – production, engineering
 Michael Lavine – photography
 Live Skull – production

Release history

References

External links 
 

Caroline Records albums
Albums produced by Martin Bisi
1989 albums